In law, selective enforcement occurs when government officials (such as police officers, prosecutors, or regulators) exercise discretion, which is the power to choose whether or how to punish a person who has violated the law. The biased use of enforcement discretion, such as that based on racial prejudice or corruption, is usually considered a legal abuse and a threat to the rule of law.

In some cases, selective enforcement may be desirable. For example, a verbal warning to a teenager may effectively alter their behavior without resorting to legal punishment and with the added benefit of reducing governmental legal costs.  In other cases, selective enforcement may be inevitable. For example, it may be impractical for police officers to issue traffic tickets to every driver they observe exceeding the speed limit, so they may have no choice but to limit action to the most flagrant examples of reckless driving.  Therefore, the mere fact that a law is selectively enforced against one person and not against another, absent bias or pattern of enforcement against a constitutionally-protected class, is not illegal.

United States

Immigration law
Selective enforcement has become a topic of great discussion in the illegal immigration debate.  The 2011 "Morton Memo" laid out enforcement priorities for the U.S. Immigration and Customs Enforcement, and was intended to channel limited resources into prioritized pursuit of cases involving criminals and felons.  It was interpreted as the waiver of active prosecution of non-criminal illegal aliens and the exclusive focus on criminal illegal aliens.  Enforcement priorities were further defined by the Deferred Action for Childhood Arrivals program, which started in 2012.  This uses the executive branch's discretionary authority to grant certain people who were illegally brought to the United States as minors the temporary authorization to live and work in the United States.

See also 
 Selective prosecution
 Prosecutorial discretion
 Equality before the law
 Ticket fixing

Further reading
Michal Tamir, "Public Law as a Whole and Normative Duality: Reclaiming Administrative Insights in Enforcement Review", 12 Texas Journal on Civil Liberties and Civil Rights 43-99 (2006)

References

Ethically disputed judicial practices
Law enforcement terminology